Büğdüz is a village in the Burdur District of Burdur Province in Turkey. Its population is 1,538 (2021). Before the 2013 reorganisation, it was a town (belde).

References

Villages in Burdur District